Bloody Sunday may refer to:

Historical events

Canada 
 Bloody Sunday (1923)#Historical context, a day of police violence during a steelworkers' strike for union recognition in Sydney, Cape Breton Island, Nova Scotia
 Bloody Sunday (1938), police violence against unemployment protesters in Vancouver, British Columbia, Canada

Ireland 
 Bloody Sunday (1913), an attack by police against protesting trade unionists in Dublin, Ireland during the Dublin lock-out
 Bloody Sunday (1920), a day of violence in Dublin during the Irish War of Independence, in which the Irish Republican Army assassinated 15 people, most suspected of being members of the Cairo Gang, a group of British Army intelligence officers active in Ireland and the British retaliated by massacring 14 Irish civilians at  a sports arena.
 Bloody Sunday (1921), a day of violence in Belfast during the Irish War of Independence, in which police launched a raid against Irish republicans which was ambushed by the Irish Republican Army
 Bloody Sunday (1972), the killing of 14 civil rights protesters by British soldiers in Derry, Northern Ireland

England 
 Bloody Sunday (1887), a day of violent clashes between protestors and police in London, England
 Bloody Sunday, a police charge on a crowd of protestors during the 1911 Liverpool general transport strike

Poland
 Bloody Sunday (1939) or Bromberg Bloody Sunday, events in Bydgoszcz, Poland, at the onset of World War II
 Stanislawow Ghetto massacre (or ), 12 October 1941 massacre of Jews before the Stanisławów Ghetto announcement
 Volhynian Bloody Sunday, a 1943 massacre of ethnic Poles by Ukrainian National Army paramilitaries

United States 
 Everett massacre, a violent confrontation between police and striking workers in Everett, Washington, United States in November 1916
 Bloody Sunday (1965), the violent suppression of a civil rights march by state and local law enforcement in Selma, Alabama

Other 
 Bloody Sunday (1900), a day of high British military casualties during the Second Boer War
 Bloody Sunday (1905), the killing of unarmed demonstrators by Russian soldiers in Saint Petersburg, Russia
 Marburg's Bloody Sunday, a massacre of ethnically German civilians by soldiers during a protest in Maribor, Slovenia in 1919
 Bloody Sunday (Bolzano), a 1921 day of unrest instigated by fascists in Bolzano, Italy
 Bloody Sunday (1926), a day of violence in Alsace between French nationalists and Alsatian autonomists
 Altona Bloody Sunday, a 1932 confrontation among the Sturmabteilung and Schutzstaffel, the police, and Communist Party supporters in Altona, Hamburg
 Bloody Sunday (1968), a massacre in Prostějov during Warsaw Pact invasion of Czechoslovakia.
 Bloody Sunday (1969), violence after a protest in Taksim Square, Istanbul, Turkey
 January Events (Lithuania) or Bloody Sunday, the 1991 killing of 14 civilians by the Soviet Army following the Act of the Re-Establishment of the State of Lithuania
 2021 Calabarzon raids, the killing of nine activists and arrest of six individuals in Calabarzon, Philippines, by the Philippine National Police and the Armed Forces of the Philippines

Other uses 

 Bloody Sunday (radio show), a 2006 Australian radio programme
 Bloody Sunday (film), a 2002 film about the 1972 event
 Bloody Sunday: Scenes from the Saville Inquiry, a 2005 play by Richard Norton-Taylor

See also 

 Black Sunday (disambiguation)
 Bloody Sunday Inquiry, a 1998 inquiry commissioned by Tony Blair to investigate the killings of 1972
 Sunday Bloody Sunday (disambiguation)
 Bloody Saturday (1919), a strikebreaking action carried out against the Winnipeg general strike, killing two
 Bloody Saturday (disambiguation)